Will Rollings (born 4 September 1994) is an English cricketer. He made his first-class debut on 1 April 2018 for Loughborough MCCU against Sussex as part of the Marylebone Cricket Club University fixtures.

References

External links
 

1994 births
Living people
English cricketers
Loughborough MCCU cricketers